Washington Township is one of thirteen townships in Grant County, Indiana, United States. As of the 2010 census, its population was 3,803 and it contained 1,711 housing units.

History
The Dr. Richard Davis House was listed on the National Register of Historic Places in 1997.

Geography
The streams of Big Lick Creek and Hummel Creek run through this township.

Cities and towns
 Marion (northeast edge)

Unincorporated towns
 Hanfield
 Landess
 Shadeland
(This list is based on USGS data and may include former settlements.)

Adjacent townships
 Wayne Township, Huntington County (north)
 Jefferson Township, Huntington County (northeast)
 Van Buren Township (east)
 Monroe Township (southeast)
 Center Township (south)
 Pleasant Township (west)
 Liberty Township, Wabash County (northwest)

Cemeteries
The township contains three cemeteries: Fairview, Hummel-Lobdell and Salem.

Major highways

References
 U.S. Board on Geographic Names (GNIS)
 United States Census Bureau cartographic boundary files

External links
 Indiana Township Association
 United Township Association of Indiana

Townships in Grant County, Indiana
Townships in Indiana